Holly Chase Ward (born April 15, 1996) is an American softball player who is currently the Assistant Head Coach at Troy. She attended Haleyville High School in Haleyville, Alabama. She later attended Mississippi State University, where she played pitcher on the Mississippi State Bulldogs softball team. While playing for Mississippi State, Ward threw a perfect game on February 9, 2018; a 10–0 victory in 5 innings over Mississippi Valley State. After graduating from Mississippi State, Ward played professional softball with the Scrap Yard Fast Pitch team in Houston, Texas.

References

External links
 
Mississippi State bio
Scrap Yard bio

1996 births
American softball players
Living people
Softball players from Alabama
People from Haleyville, Alabama
Mississippi State Bulldogs softball players
Scrap Yard Dawgs players